The English singer Natasha Bedingfield has released 4 studio albums, 19 singles, 24 music videos, and 1 video album.

Bedingfield's debut album, Unwritten, was released in the United Kingdom in September 2004. It produced four singles: "Single", "These Words", which peaked at number one on the UK Singles Chart, "Unwritten" and "I Bruise Easily". The album reached number one on the UK Albums Chart and was certified 3× Platinum by the British Phonographic Industry (BPI). Her second album, N.B., was released in 2007 and was less successful, but still reached number nine in the UK and produced two UK top ten singles. For the North American market, N.B. was repackaged and was released with an altered track listing under the name Pocketful of Sunshine in January 2008. The album reached number three on the US Billboard 200 and was certified Gold by the Recording Industry Association of America (RIAA). Bedingfield's third album, Strip Me, was released in the United States and Canada in December 2010. The album received similar treatment to its predecessor and was released in Europe under the title Strip Me Away in 2011.

Albums

Studio albums

Video albums

Extended plays

Singles

As lead artist

As featured artist

Promotional singles

Music videos

Other appearances

See also
 List of songs written by Natasha Bedingfield

References

External links
 Natasha Bedingfield Official website
 
 

Discography
Pop music discographies
Discographies of British artists